Franci Clarck Bouebari Kitsamoutse (born 12 September 2003) is a French professional footballer who plays as a centre-back for Strasbourg.

Club career
Bouebari is a youth product of Strasbourg, and was promoted to their reserves in 2022. He made his professional debut with Strasbourg in a 2–1 Ligue 1 win over Lyon on 14 January 2023, coming on as an early substitute and assisting his side's first goal.

References

External links
 

2001 births
Living people
Footballers from Strasbourg
French footballers
French sportspeople of Republic of the Congo descent
Association football defenders
RC Strasbourg Alsace players
Ligue 1 players
Championnat National 3 players